Augusta School District is a public school district serving the communities of Augusta, Arkansas, United States. Augusta School District employs over more than 120 faculty and staff to provide educational programs for students ranging from prekindergarten through twelfth grade at its three facilities that enroll more than 500 students.

The school district encompasses  of land within Woodruff and Monroe counties including all or portions of the communities of Augusta, Cotton Plant, and Gregory.

All schools in the district are accredited by the Arkansas Department of Education.

History 
On July 1, 2004, the Cotton Plant School District merged into the Augusta School District.

Schools 
 Augusta High School (Augusta): Grades 7–12
 Augusta Elementary School (Augusta) : Grades PK–6

Closed:
 Cotton Plant Elementary School (Cotton Plant) : Grades PK–4 - In 2014 the Augusta school district planned to close Cotton Plant Elementary and the Arkansas Department of Education (ADE) approved the closure.

References

Further reading
 2004-2005 School District Map
 Map of Arkansas School Districts pre-July 1, 2004
 (Download)

External links 
 
 

School districts in Arkansas
Education in Woodruff County, Arkansas
Education in Monroe County, Arkansas